Indiscreet is the debut album from British hard rock band FM. Indiscreet was originally released in 1986 on the Portrait Records label, a sister label of Epic Records. The song "Frozen Heart" became a moderately successful single. The song "That Girl" was covered by Iron Maiden as a B-side to their single "Stranger in a Strange Land" following its inclusion in a live set by The Entire Population of Hackney (featuring Andy Barnett, erstwhile and future FM member and friend of Maiden guitarist Adrian Smith). Written by Merv Goldsworthy, Pete Jupp and Andy Barnett in an early FM line-up, it was one of the demo songs which secured FM their record contract with Portrait/Epic in 1984. By the time Indiscreet was released FM had re-written parts of their song, while Iron Maiden's release three weeks later covered the original arrangement.

Track listing 
"That Girl" – 3:55 (M. Goldsworthy/P. Jupp/A. Barnett)
"Other Side of Midnight" – 4:07 (M. Goldsworthy/P. Jupp)
"Love Lies Dying" – 4:46 (M. Goldsworthy/S. Overland/P. Jupp/C. Overland/D. Digital)
"I Belong to the Night" – 4:17 (S. Overland/C. Overland)
"American Girls" – 4:06 (S. Overland/C. Overland)
"Hot Wired" – 4:49 (M. Goldsworthy)
"Face to Face" – 4:37 (S. Overland/C. Overland/P. Jupp)
"Frozen Heart" – 5:07 (M. Goldsworthy/S. Overland/P. Jupp/C. Overland/D. Digital)
"Heart of the Matter" – 4:27 (S. Overland/C. Overland)

2005 remaster bonus tracks
"Captured"
"Alibi"
"Hold On to the Night"
"American Girls (Live)"
"Face to Face (Live)"
"Other Side of Midnight (Live)"
"Say It Like It Is (Live)"
"Dangerous (Live)"

2012 remaster bonus tracks
"Other Side of Midnight (BBC Session)"
"Face to Face (BBC Session)"
"That Girl (BBC Session)"
"Dangerous (BBC Session)"
"Frozen Heart (Live)"

"Frozen Heart (Extended)"
"Captured"
"American Girls (Live)"
"Say It Like It Is (Live)"
"American Girls (Instrumental)"
"Let Love Be the Leader"
"Let Love Be the Leader (Extended)"
"Let Love Be the Leader (Live)"
"Other Side of Midnight (Live)"
"Face to Face (Live)"
"Bad Luck (Extended)"
"Addicted to Love (Live)"
"Hot Legs (Live)"

Personnel 
Steve Overland – Lead vocals, guitar
Merv Goldsworthy – Bass, backing vocals
Pete Jupp – Drums, backing vocals
Chris Overland – Lead guitar
Didge Digital – Keyboards

Production 
Produced, arranged and engineered by Merv Goldsworthy, Steve Overland, Pete Jupp, Chris Overland, Didge Digital and Dave King.Assisted by Alan Moulder, Pete Woodroffe, George Shilling and Mark Robinson.Recorded at Mediterranean Studios (Ibiza), Comforts Place (Surrey) and Livingston Studios (London).

References 

Portrait Records albums
FM (British band) albums
1986 debut albums